Colin Gray may refer to:
 Colin Falkland Gray (1914–1995), New Zealand fighter ace of the Second World War
 Colin Keith Gray, Canadian actor, writer and film director
 Colin S. Gray (1943–2020), British-American scholar of international relations